The 2014 Women's EuroHockey Indoor Championship was the seventeenth edition of the Women's EuroHockey Indoor Championship, the biennial international women's indoor hockey championship of Europe organized by the European Hockey Federation. It was held from 24 to 26 January 2018 in Prague, Czech Republic.

The Netherlands won the tournament for the first time after defeating Germany 3–0 in the final.

The two bottom ranked teams of the tournament were relegated to the 2016 EuroHockey Indoor Nations Championship II.

Qualified teams
The following teams participated in the 2014 EuroHockey Indoor Nations Championship.

Results

Preliminary round

Pool A

Pool B

Fifth to eighth place classification

Pool C
The points obtained in the preliminary round against the other team are taken over.

First to fourth place classification

Semi-finals

Third place game

Final

Statistics

Final standings

Awards

Goalscorers

See also
2014 Men's EuroHockey Indoor Championship
2014 Women's EuroHockey Indoor Championship II

References

Women's EuroHockey Indoor Championship
International women's indoor hockey competitions hosted by the Czech Republic
EuroHockey Indoor Championship
EuroHockey Indoor Championship
Sports competitions in Prague
EuroHockey Indoor Championship Women
2010s in Prague
Women 1